The British School of Barcelona (BSB) is a private coeducational bilingual international school located in the Barcelona metropolitan area, Catalonia, Spain.

It is an all-through British International school for students aged 2–18 with four campuses in Barcelona, Castelldefels and Sitges.

In October 2021, the school was graded as an 'Outstanding School in every Category' following the BSO inspection as a British Schools Overseas run by the English Department for Education (DfE) of the British Government. In their report, the inspectors highlighted the quality of education, the strong sense of community among staff, students and families, and the global educational standards of the school. 

The school is formally recognised and accredited by the British government for teaching the English National Curriculum, and by the International Baccalaureate Organization to deliver the International Baccalaureate (IB) Diploma Programme (DP). The school is also authorised to validate the Spanish ESO and Bachillerato (Secondary and Sixth Form) by the Spanish Ministry of Education and the Catalan department of Education.

The British School of Barcelona has been a Cognita school since 2007.

The school is a founder member of the National Association of British Schools in Spain (NABSS).

History

 Founded in 1958 as the Anglo-American School. In 1978, the first Royal Decree recognizing foreign schools in Spain was published and studies were validated for Spanish pupils as well. The recognition of studies was an important factor in the growth of the school, as more families from the local area showed interest in British education and the learning of English, and the need for expansion became apparent.

 In 1999 The British School of Barcelona is founded.
 In 2007, the owners transferred its ownership to the Cognita Schools Group.
 In January 2016 Cognita Group acquires International School of Barcelona, located in Sitges, and the school is integrated as a new campus under the brand of The British School of Barcelona as from September 2016.
 April 2018 sees the opening of BSB Nexus, the new Pre-University campus of The British School of Barcelona in Castelldefels.
 In September 2019 the school expands its sports facilities with a new 9,000 sqm rugby and football stadium adjacent to the BSB Castelldefels campus.
 In 2021 BSB opens a new campus in the city of Barcelona (Sarrià-Sant Gervasi). The new BSB City campus becomes the fourth campus of The British School of Barcelona. The BSB City Foundation campus opened in September 2021 for Early Years and Primary children. BSB City will then expand to Secondary and Pre-University students with the opening of the Main Campus in September 2023 in the same area.
 In October 2021 BSB opens a BSB Science, Technology, Engineering and Mathematics (STEM) Centre in Castelldefels opposite the BSB Nexus campus. This Centre expands existing lab space 

The British School of Barcelona is considered one of the most important international schools in Spain (El Mundo, Best Schools in Spain, and Forbes Magazine, Los 100 mejores colegios de España

Facilities 

The school has campuses in Barcelona, Castelldefels and Sitges. It serves children from the city and surrounding areas. 

BSB Sitges: From Pre-Nursery to Year 6 (2-11 years old)
 BSB Castelldefels: From Nursery to Year 11 (3-16 years old)
 BSB Nexus, in Castelldefels: Pre-University campus for students in Years 12 and 13 (16-18 years old)
BSB City, in Barcelona: From Nursery to Pre-University (3-18 years old)

School organisation and studies 

The British School of Barcelona educates children from pre-nursery school age (2 years old, at BSB Sitges) and nursery school age (3 years old, at BSB Castelldefels and BSB CIty) to university entrance (18 years old).

Studies at the school mainly follow the National Curriculum of England and Wales. Pupils at the school then study for GCSE examinations and, as they enter Pre-University education, can then choose between Advanced Level examinations (A Levels) or the International Baccalaureate (IB Diploma Programme (DP). Both programmes share a core curriculum of subjects that all students take.

The Pre-University curriculum also ensures that students can fulfil the requirements of the Spanish and Catalan Governments so that they can achieve the Spanish qualifications (ESO and Bachillerato) if they complete the relevant courses and assessments throughout Secondary and Pre-University.

In addition, the school also prepares the students to take the Spanish University Access exams (PCE or Pruebas de Competencias Específicas) to access Spanish universities, which is organised by the UNED (Universidad Nacional de Educación a Distancia).

References

Schools in the Province of Barcelona
International schools in Catalonia
Educational institutions established in 1958
Barcelona
1958 establishments in Spain
Secondary schools in Spain
Cognita
Private schools in Spain
Castelldefels
Sitges